The Estevez family (also known by the stage surname Sheen) is an American acting family of Spanish-Galician and Irish descent. Members include:

 
American families of Irish ancestry
American people of Galician descent
Roman Catholic families